Fostoria Metropolitan Airport  is a city-owned public airport two miles northeast of Fostoria, Ohio, United States. The FAA's National Plan of Integrated Airport Systems for 2009-2013 classified it as a general aviation airport.

Most U.S. airports use the same three-letter location identifier for the FAA and IATA, but this airport is FZI to the FAA and has no IATA code.

Facilities 
Its one runway, 9/27, is 5,000 by 100 feet (1,524 x 30 m) asphalt.

In the year ending May 19, 2008 the airport had 7,900 aircraft operations, average 21 per day: 95% general aviation and 5% air taxi. 14 aircraft were then based at this airport: 93% single-engine and 7% jet.

Awards 
The fixed-base operator (FBO) David Sniffen III was recognized by the Ohio Aviation Association as the 2010 Airport Manager of the Year for the state of Ohio.

References

External links
 Aerial photo as of 6 May 1995 from USGS The National Map
 

Airports in Ohio
Fostoria, Ohio
Buildings and structures in Seneca County, Ohio
Transportation in Seneca County, Ohio